"Falling Down" is the first single from Space Cowboy's album, "Digital Rock Star". It was written and co-produced by RedOne and Nick Dresti.  It features Chelsea Korka from the Paradiso Girls providing guest vocals, while the video shows the entire group dancing. The track was released as the album's lead single on 19 May 2009 throughout Europe, after being leaked in April.

Track listing

Music video
The music video is set in a club scene with a colourful backdrop and features Space Cowboy and Chelsea Korka dancing, along with the rest of Korka's band, the Paradiso Girls however, only Korka is featured vocally on the single. Colby O'Donis is also featured non-vocally in the video. (He is seen briefly dancing with Chelsea a few times)

The video can be seen here at the Cherrytree Record website .

Falling Down Remix EP

Falling Down Remix is the first extended play by the French-born English recording artist Space Cowboy. It contains remixes by Frankmusik, Robots to Mars, and Space Cowboy himself. It was released by Cherrytree Records on 25 August 2009.

Charts

References

2009 singles
British pop songs
Space Cowboy (musician) songs
Songs written by RedOne
Song recordings produced by RedOne
2009 songs
Cherrytree Records singles
Songs written by Space Cowboy (musician)